D'Brickashaw Montgomery Ferguson (born December 10, 1983) is a former American football offensive tackle who played ten seasons for the New York Jets of the National Football League (NFL).  He played college football for the University of Virginia and received All-American honors.  He was picked by the Jets fourth overall in the 2006 NFL Draft, and was selected for the Pro Bowl three times. Ferguson made 160 consecutive regular season starts and never missed a game in his entire career.

Early years
Ferguson's given name was inspired by Father Ralph de Bricassart, a character in the 1977 novel The Thorn Birds. He attended Freeport High School in the Long Island village of Freeport, New York. He nearly gave up football during his freshman year in high school.

Considered a three-star recruit by Rivals.com, Ferguson was ranked as the No. 29 offensive guard prospect in the nation. He chose Virginia over Michigan State.

College career
While attending the University of Virginia, Ferguson played for the Virginia Cavaliers football team. He started 49 games for the Cavaliers, and he was named to the consensus All-America first-team during his final season. He was placed on the all-Atlantic Coast Conference first-team two years in a row, and he became Virginia's first All-ACC offensive tackle since 1998. Ferguson started at left tackle in four consecutive bowl games for the Cavaliers. He played linebacker on a special defensive package employed sparingly in 2003. He did this while earning a religious studies degree in only 3.5 years. He was an All-America selection in 2004 by Pro Football Weekly.

Professional career

Considered an undersized tackle after playing at 295 pounds during his senior year at Virginia, Ferguson officially weighed in at 312 for the NFL combine. As a tackle, Ferguson's talent is found in his lower body strength, athleticism and flexibility. This athleticism and flexibility is further evidenced in his attaining a black belt in Shotokan karate and brown belt in taekwondo.

Ferguson was one of six players the NFL invited to New York for the 2006 NFL Draft events. He was selected 4th overall by the New York Jets. The last time the Jets used their first pick on a tackle was 1988, when they selected Dave Cadigan of USC at No. 8.

Ferguson was drafted by the New York Jets with the 4th overall pick of the 2006 NFL Draft. On July 26, 2006, Ferguson signed a five-year deal with the team. The deal was similar to the $35 million deal that 2005’s No. 4 pick, Cedric Benson, signed with the Chicago Bears. Designated as Jason Fabini's successor, Ferguson started every game at left tackle for the Jets since the beginning of the 2006 NFL season. On January 8, 2010, Miami Dolphins Tackle Jake Long withdrew from the 2010 Pro Bowl due to injuries and Ferguson was named as his replacement. He was invited to the 2011 Pro Bowl.

On April 8, 2016, Ferguson announced his retirement from the NFL after 10 seasons, having made 160 consecutive starts and never missing a game. He played 10,707 out of 10,708 regular season offensive snaps in his career. In his retirement statement, Ferguson wrote, "I would like to thank every coach, every teammate, and every fan that has shown me support throughout my career. I sincerely thank you all from the bottom of my heart."

Personal life
Ferguson's hometown of Freeport, New York, dedicated a street to him on September 29, 2009. South Ocean Avenue, where he grew up, received secondary signage as D'Brickashaw Ferguson Way. His father, Ed Ferguson Sr., is a native of Nassau, Bahamas, and his older brother, Edwin, also graduated from the University of Virginia. He is also a black belt in Karate and brown belt in Taekwondo.

Ferguson was the inspiration for the recurring East–West College Bowl sketch on the Comedy Central sketch comedy series Key & Peele, in which comedians Keegan-Michael Key and Jordan Peele portray football players with humorous names when introducing themselves. One iteration of the sketch featured real-life football players, including Ferguson himself.

References

External links

New York Jets bio

1983 births
Living people
American people of Bahamian descent
African-American players of American football
American Conference Pro Bowl players
American football offensive tackles
New York Jets players
People from Freeport, New York
Virginia Cavaliers football players
Players of American football from New York (state)
Sportspeople from Nassau County, New York
21st-century African-American sportspeople
20th-century African-American people